Macassar is a small town in South Africa, close to Strand and Somerset West, with an approximate population of 33,225. Administratively it is a suburb of the City of Cape Town.

Macassar’s history is closely tied to the Strand, whose inhabitants first settled this area. The kramat (shrine) of Sheikh Yusuf (Tuanta Salamaka) of the Sultanate of Gowa, in present-day Makassar in Indonesia, is a holy place to South Africa's Muslim community. The Sheikh, who was exiled by the Dutch in 1694, came to the Strand area and made it his final resting place; although his followers, who were mainly fishermen, found the sea of Macassar rather uninviting and moved further along the coast to Strand’s Mosterds Bay. After Yusuf died, his followers named the area after his birthplace, spelling it with "c" in place of "k". 

The Macassar Dunes Conservation Area forms part of the vital coastal dune system, one of the biodiversity hotspots of the Western Cape. These dunes have been impacted by conflicting activities such as cattle grazing and 4X4 vehicle use.

Macassar is a predominantly Coloured community close to the Macassar Dunes, whose workers historically are in the fishing and boatmaking industry.

History

Education

 Macassar Primary
 Macassar Secondary 
 Marvin Park Primary
 Oklahomastreet Primary
 False Bay Primary 
 Zandvliet High School

List of Suburbs

 Bell Glen
 Brandwacht
 Chris Hani Park
 Deaconsville
 Deep Freeze
 Macassar Village
 Marvin Park
 New Macassar
 New Scheme
 Riverside
 Ruben Road
 Smartie Town

Other Locations

 Boys Town Macassar
 Macassar Beach Pavilion (derelict)
 Macassar CDC Clinic
 Macassar Fire Department
 Macassar Municipal Offices
 Macassar New Hall
 Macassar New Sports Ground
 Macassar Old Sports Ground
 Macassar Police Station
 Macassar Public Library
 Macassar Waste Water Treatment Works
 Rheinmettal Denel Munition Factory
 Sheikh Yusuf's Kramat

See also
 Macassar Village Land Occupation

References

Suburbs of Cape Town